Sudhakar Rao Aiyagari (November 9, 1951 – May 20, 1997) was an Indian-born economics professor at the University of Rochester.   He had previous been a leading research economist at the Minneapolis Fed, prior to which he had taught, in the 1980s, at New York University, University of Wisconsin, Madison, and Carnegie-Mellon University in Pittsburgh.

Aiyagari made significant contributions to the economics literature, primarily in the areas of macroeconomics, monetary theory and intertemporal general equilibrium theory. He died of a heart attack while playing tennis aged 45.   Aiyagari held a doctorate in economics (received 1981) from the University of Minnesota and master's degrees in economics and physics from Jawaharlal Nehru University in New Delhi and the Indian Institute of Technology, Delhi, India.

Select Publications

References

External links 
The Contributions of S. Rao Aiyagari to Dynamic Macroeconomics
S. Rao Aiyagari: My Student and My Teacher
Obituary Minneapolis Fed
Obituary University of Rochester

1951 births
1997 deaths
University of Minnesota College of Liberal Arts alumni
University of Rochester faculty
20th-century American economists
Jawaharlal Nehru University alumni
IIT Delhi alumni
Indian emigrants to the United States
20th-century Indian economists